Sunaree Ratchasima (born March 16, 1968) is a famous Thai Luk thung singer.

Early life
Sonna was born in Nakhon Ratchasima Province, to Thin and Yom Sonna.

She married Walther Deloft, a Dutch man on December 18, 2019.

Career
She entered a singing contest to help her family and to escape her job as a poorly-paid tailor. In 1983, she became a contestant in the TV show Chum Thang Kon Den by Channel 7 and became a runner-up; Suksan Hansa liked her music tone so she supported her.

She recorded her first album La Khorat, but it failed to become popular. She joined Sure Entertainment, and recorded her second album Sud Thai Thee Krung Thep, directed by Chonlathee Thanthong which became a success. She has recorded many albums and appeared in films.

Discography

Albums
"Sud Thai Thee Krung Thep" (สุดท้ายที่กรุงเทพ)
"Eek Nid Si" (อีกนิดซิ)
"Bao Bao Si" (เบาๆ ซิ)
"Khong Fak Jak Ban Nok" (ของฝากจากบ้านอก)
"Thang Sai Mai" (ทางสายใหม่)
"Raiyan Jak Huajai" (รายงานจากหัวใจ)
"Jep Toe" (จีบต่อ)
"Tham Pen Kuean" (ทำเป็นเขิน)
"Thee Kao Soay Dueam" (ที่เก่าซอยเดิม)
"Fon Nao Sao Kruan" (ฝนหนาวสาวครวญ)
"Lakorn Bot Cham" (ละครบทช้ำ)
"Thee Pueng Thang Jai" (ที่พึ่งทางใจ)
"Manee Ploi Roy Saeng" (มณีพลอยร้อยแสง)

Popular Music
 "Sud Thai Thee Krung Thep"
 "Krab Thao Ya Moe"
 "Klab Bai Tham Miea Doo Khon"
 "Motorcy Nung San"
 "Mue Tue Mai Fai Song Naa"
 "Jam Sieang Lieang Phoe"

Filmography
 2012 – Tom Yam Lam Sing – role Rungrawee's mother.
 2013 – Mr Banna – role Jimmy's mother.
 2014 – Malee Rueang Raba" – role Cookwoman.
 2017 – Rak Long Loaeng – role Massi.
 2018 – Sao Noy Roi Moe – role Cham.

References

1968 births
Living people
Sunaree Ratchasima
Sunaree Ratchasima
Sunaree Ratchasima